Vicky Burky (born Victorine Cherryline Soedarjono Burki; June 17, 1964) is an Indonesian former soap opera actress and aerobic instructor of Dutch-Sundanese descent. She has gained to popularity for her antagonist role in almost all soap opera.

Career
She has appeared in the soap operas Janji Hati (Promises of the Hearts), Kesucian Prasasti (Sanctity Prasasti), Takdir (Destiny), Anakku Bukan Anakku (My Children is Not My Children, Kehormatan (Honor), Bidadari 2 (Angel 2), Bidadari 3 (Angel 3), Hidayah, Dongeng (Fairy Tale), Hikayah, Dewi (Goddess), Anissa, Seindah Senyum Winona (The Beautiful Smile of Winona) and Sejuta Cinta Marshanda (The Million Loves of Marshanda). She usually plays villainous, wicked, murderous, malicious, sadistic, vicious, and evil characters. She has also appeared in theater productions such as Boenga Roos dari Tjikembang (Boenga Roos of Tjikembang), The Vagina Monologues, and Madame Dasima.

Personal life
She has stated a preference for living together rather than marrying, as she does not feel that marriage guarantees happiness and togetherness.

Filmography

Film

Television

Theater
 Boenga Ross dari Tjikembang (Boenga Ross of Tjikembang)
 Vagina Monologues,  directed by Ria Irawan
 Madame Dasima

References

External links
 Profil di KapanLagi.com

1965 births
Indonesian actresses
Indonesian people of Dutch descent
People from Bandung
Indonesian Christians
Indo people
Sundanese people
Living people